Sonntagberg is a town in the district of Amstetten in Lower Austria in Austria. It is an important Catholic pilgrimage center.

Geography
Sonntagberg lies in the Mostviertel in Lower Austria. About 29 percent of the municipality is forested.

Sights
It has a baroque church that was, in its current form, built in 1706–1732 by Jakob Prandtauer and Joseph Munggenast. The ceilings were painted by Daniel Gran (1738–43). In 1964, Pope Paul VI gave it the title Basilica minor.

For a short while, Sonntagberg was the location of what would then become Summerhill School.

References

Cities and towns in Amstetten District